David Rodger may refer to:

 Dave Rodger (born 1955), New Zealand rower
 David J. Rodger (1970–2015), British author and game designer